"Chuck Versus the Other Guy" is the thirteenth episode of Chuck third season, and originally aired on April 5, 2010. Sarah and Shaw are ordered to track down the Director by Beckman, but Chuck has misgivings over whether Shaw can be trusted after the revelation that Sarah killed his wife.

Plot summary

Main Plot
As the episode opens, Shaw has taken Sarah to a warehouse where he claims the Director has been tracked. The two break into the facility and Shaw leads her down into its lower levels, where he deliberately separates from Sarah and leaves her alone to find video equipment playing a looped recording of the film shown to him by the Director. Sarah recognizes it as her red test, and Shaw reveals to her that the woman she killed was his wife, Evelyn. He tells the stunned Sarah that he knows she wasn't to blame and that she was set up by her superiors to make the kill. Meanwhile, Chuck is panicking over Sarah's situation and turns to Casey for help, but Casey is still discouraged by civilian life. Chuck manages to convince him to help when Sarah's emergency locator activates. With contact information provided by Casey, Chuck launches an assault on the warehouse complex only to arrive and find Shaw hugging Sarah in apparent forgiveness.

Back at Castle, Chuck is reprimanded by Beckman for his unauthorized use of the strike team, although Shaw defends his actions to protect his partner. Nonetheless, Beckman benches Chuck and orders Sarah and Shaw to Washington to head up the search for the Director. Shaw finds the director, and Sarah chooses Chuck to help them apprehend him.

Chuck is unsure of Shaw, but goes along with the attempt to apprehend the Director by breaking into his private elevator while Shaw provides security. Chuck and Sarah confront the Director, who reveals that the Ring has developed its own prototype of the Intersect Cipher, and carefully manipulates the situation to create a Mexican Standoff between Sarah, Chuck, and two of his operatives. He then reveals that they have walked into a trap when several additional Ring agents arrive and force Chuck and Sarah to stand down. Shaw arrives and kills the Director's men, and offers to cover their withdrawal while he retrieves the Cipher. The elevator doors close, leaving Chuck and Sarah outside as they hear a gunshot. However, after they leave the facility it is revealed that the entire incident was staged by the Director, and Shaw has in fact joined the Ring.

The team debriefs at Castle, and Beckman this time reprimands Shaw for apparently killing the Director, but Chuck comes to his defense for saving their lives. Beckman reveals that the Ring's Cipher is flawed, and based on the components, was manufactured in Paris. Beckman orders Shaw and Sarah to follow-up. Chuck returns home, and while Morgan is unconvinced of Shaw's motives, Chuck is confident of Shaw's loyalty. However, when he shows Morgan security footage of Shaw defeating several Ring operatives in hand-to-hand combat, Morgan stops the video when he notices that none of Shaw's attacks actually connected (due to his expertise on fake action scenes in films). Chuck attempts to contact Beckman with this discovery, but she angrily suspends Chuck when she sees Morgan in Castle, leaving the two to help Sarah alone. However, Morgan reminds Chuck they have one more asset they can count on, and Chuck and Casey are soon on a flight to Paris.

Meanwhile, Shaw takes Sarah to the street where Evelyn was killed and Sarah realizes he has been turned by the Ring. She is then poisoned by a paralytic agent. The Ring Director reveals that the CIA suspected Eve may have been turned, so CIA Director Graham ordered Sarah's red test to eliminate her. Shaw turns over all his technical data on the Intersect to the Director, who leaves so Shaw can finish Sarah off. However, Chuck and Casey arrive, and while Casey deals with the Director, Chuck confronts Shaw. The two get into a fight, but even with the Intersect, Chuck is unable to defeat Shaw and is soon incapacitated. Shaw apologizes and assures Chuck that he is not at fault, and promises not to reveal his identity as the Intersect if he does not interfere. Chuck will not allow Sarah to be killed and pursues anyway, confronting him on the bridge where Shaw intends to throw Sarah into the river. Chuck tries to reason with Shaw, but Shaw is convinced Chuck is unable to shoot and cannot abandon his own desire for revenge for Eve's death. With no other options to save Sarah's life, Chuck shoots Shaw in the chest, and he topples over the bridge, trying to pull Sarah over the edge with him into the river below. Chuck saves Sarah, but can only watch as Shaw falls to his death.

The next day, Chuck explains everything to Sarah who is not disappointed that he killed Shaw to save her.

Chuck and Sarah

Chuck goes home and gets drunk after being benched, and flashes and ties up Morgan when the latter tries to take away the bottle. Sarah arrives to discuss the situation and Chuck asks her if she loves him. Sarah says yes, and that she fell for him from the first time they met. Sarah then tells him they have a mission and takes him to meet Shaw to capture the Director.

When Sarah later recovers from her poisoning at the hands of the Ring, she awakens in Paris and pieces together the events of the previous night. She realizes that Chuck was forced to kill Shaw and that he saved her life. Recognizing that in spite of this, he is still the Chuck she fell in love with, she kisses him after Chuck explains why he killed Shaw. Beckman interrupts on the computer, but they break the connection and Sarah orders him to "shut up and kiss me" as they climb into bed together as a couple.

Morgan and Casey

Morgan believes that he is going to be made a full member of Team Bartowski, much to Casey's envy. Morgan subsequently tenders his resignation to Big Mike, and tells Casey to enjoy "my old life," a sentiment Casey mirrors. However, Beckman later proves displeased with Chuck involving Morgan in the mission when he recognized Shaw's fight with the Ring was staged, and suspends Chuck instead.

Meanwhile, Casey is still largely paralyzed by his dismissal and initially unwilling to help when Morgan and Chuck arrive to enlist him in their off-book operation to save Sarah. However, Morgan is able to appeal to his sense of duty and convinces him to help. On the flight, Chuck's ability to flash is of no use in determining Shaw's destination, however Casey reminds Chuck of his own intelligence without the need of the Intersect.

In Paris, Casey apprehends the Director and uses him as a bargaining chip with Beckman to get himself reinstated, and also convinces her to make Morgan an official part of the team. Morgan receives her call just after he returns to working at the Buy More. Morgan goes to quit again but Beckman reminds him that he has to stay to maintain his cover.

Production

Continuity
 This episode title as well as the one before it, "Chuck Versus the American Hero", both are references to Shaw.
 This episode marks the first time that Chuck has ever deliberately killed someone.
 As in the previous episode, Chuck doesn't need to flash on any marksmanship skills in order to shoot accurately.
 This episode marks the first time that Chuck and Sarah are ever openly in a true relationship, as well as the first time that they make love.
 The episode ends showing the Eiffel Tower in the background, referencing Chuck's obsession with the tower in "Chuck Versus First Class". The view of the Eiffel Tower is from the Montparnasse Tower, although the image is flipped.
 In one scene were Sarah and Shaw passes in front of a parked car in Paris, the car in the background is a Peugeot 504. The specific model equipped with that type of head light was however only sold in USA and Australia.

Flashes
 Chuck flashes on how to tie up Morgan and restrain him when Morgan attempts to take away his whiskey.
 Another flash (choking techniques) during the fight with Shaw fails to enable Chuck to defeat him.
 Chuck flashes on a 10-year-old mission of Shaw's while on the plane to Paris.

Production Details
Sarah's four "yes" responses to Chuck's asking if she loves him is a callback and paralleling layer to "Chuck Versus the American Hero" when Chuck tells Sarah he loves her four times.

Reception

"Chuck Versus the Other Guy" has received universally positive reviews. IGN rated the episode a 9.5/10, equalling Chuck's series high, along with "Chuck Versus the Beard," "Chuck Versus the Colonel" and "Chuck Versus Santa Claus." The LA Times described the episode as "45 minutes of deeply entertaining television," though also cited the missteps of the season leading up to it. IF.com praised the inclusion of Morgan in the spy game to take over Chuck's role as the bumbling non-spy on the team. The AV Club also thought very highly of this episode and gave it a rating of A.

References to popular culture
 Chuck misquotes the John Hughes film Pretty in Pink while drunk, which Morgan calls him out on.
 The name of the officer Casey refers Chuck to at the beginning of the episode is "Colonel Sanders," whose name Casey advised him not to make fun of. This is in reference to Kentucky Fried Chicken.
 When Chuck tells Morgan they are the only ones who can save Sarah, Morgan replies "No, there is another." The quote and the voice used by Morgan were in reference to Yoda, who spoke the same line when told by Obi-Wan Kenobi Luke was their last hope.
 Sarah's final line in the episode, "Shut up and kiss me," was the final line of the 1987 film Who's That Girl.
 General Beckman says that the bill for Chuck's rescue mission is longer than her copy of Atlas Shrugged, which has 1,368 pages, depending on the edition.
 In the background of Chuck's room while speaking to General Beckman, there is a display stand with a Spartan helmet from the video game franchise Halo. This was released with the 3rd Halo game as part of the "Legendary Edition" for Xbox.
 At the very end of the episode, Chuck and Sarah turn away General Beckman's screen and camera so that they can make love. This is reminiscent of the end of many James Bond films.

References

External links 
 

Other Guy
2010 American television episodes